Shi Danai (史大奈), also known by his former name Ashina Danai (阿史那大奈), was a Turkic prince and the first foreigner to be a general in the Tang army. He was probably the eldest son of Chuluo Qaghan.

Career under Sui dynasty 
Shi Dinai submitted to Chinese rule as early as reign of Emperor Yang of Sui in 611. He and his followers were granted Loufan County in the northern province of Shanxi. He took part in the Goguryeo–Sui War from 612 to 614.

Career under Gaozu of Tang 
He later joined Emperor Gaozu of Tang in his campaign against the Sui dynasty's region of Guanzhong in 617. His 500-strong Turkic cavalry was instrumental in defeating Sui general Sang Xianhe (桑显和) during the Battle of Yinma Spring from an attack on his rear, for which he was rewarded with the honorific title Grand Master for Splendid Happiness. He was bestowed a Chinese surname Shi (史) after Li Yuan entered Chang'an same year. Following the establishment of the Tang dynasty, he participated in battles against Xue Ju, Wang Shichong, Dou Jiande and Liu Heita under the command of Emperor Taizong.

Later life 
He retired in the early reign of Emperor Taizong and was appointed Right Wuwei General of the Tang army. He was also granted governorship of Fengzhou and named Duke Dou (竇国公) by Taizong with 300 people assigned to his household. He died in 638 and was buried in the Zhao Mausoleum.

Family 
He had two sons. Shi Renbiao (史仁表) married Princess Pu'an (普安公主), the eighth daughter of Taizong of Tang. The other was Shi Renji (史仁基).

In literature and media 

 Text on his death stele was found in Dunhuang Manuscript S.2078, part of a student writing practice sample.
 Shi Danai is a character in Tale of Tang (说唐), a Qing era novel.
He was portrayed by Jiang Diwu in the Chinese TV series Heroes in Sui and Tang Dynasties (2013).
He was portrayed by Zhao Qiusheng in the Chinese TV series Heroes of Sui and Tang Dynasties (2012).

References 

638 deaths
Transition from Sui to Tang
Ashina house of the Turkic Empire
7th-century Turkic people
Tang dynasty generals
Sui dynasty generals